Juan Andrés Toro Gaete (born 17 May 1984) is a Chilean former footballer who played as a defender. Besides Chile, he played in Argentina.

Career
Toro made his professional debut in 2001 with Magallanes and stay with them until 2008. In 2008, he switched to Ñublense in the Chilean top division.

In 2009, he switched to Deportivo Morón. The next year, he returned to his homeland and played for San Marcos de Arica.

At international level, he represented Chile at under-20 level in the 2003 South American Championship.

After football
Toro has gone on playing football at amateur level in clubs such as Juventud Norambuena from Santiago.

References

External links
 
 
 
 Juan Toro at VoetbalZone.nl 

1984 births
Living people
Footballers from Santiago
Chilean footballers
Chile under-20 international footballers
Chilean expatriate footballers
Deportes Magallanes footballers
Magallanes footballers
Ñublense footballers
Deportivo Morón footballers
San Marcos de Arica footballers
Primera B de Chile players
Tercera División de Chile players
Chilean Primera División players
Primera B Metropolitana players
Chilean expatriate sportspeople in Argentina
Expatriate footballers in Argentina
Association football defenders